Hoi Ha is a place and a village on the innermost shore of Hoi Ha Wan, Hong Kong.  It is at the north of Pak Sha O in the Sai Kung Peninsula.

One of the most famous heritage spots in Hoi Ha Wan is the remnants  of the lime kilns. It was used to make lime from sea shells and coral. It was likely built in the early 1900s.

The name Hoi Ha comes from the same Hakka language word which broadly translates as Seashore or Seaside in English

Administration
Hoi Ha is a recognized village under the New Territories Small House Policy.

History
Hoi Ha village was established in 1811 by a group of Hakka people sharing the family name Yung who arrived at Hoi Ha and started to build houses and farm the land.

Hoi Ha archaeological site
A few coarse pottery sherds, prehistoric pottery sherds, stone implements and ceramic sherds of Tang, Ming and Qing periods were found in Hoi Ha in the two territory-wide survey.

Hoi Ha lime kiln
There are also the remnants of lime kilns. There are total 4 lime kilns in Hoi Ha but only 2 remain comparatively intact; these two kilns were restored by the Antiquities and Monuments Office in 1982 with the generous assistance of the villagers of Hoi Ha (source: Antiquities and Monuments Office)

These two kilns, built by the villagers of Hoi Ha in the early 20th century, were used to make lime by burning corals and shells. They were constructed of rubble stone and lined with crude bricks inside. The villagers collected corals and shells from the sea nearby

Lime production was once a prosperous local industry particularly at the villages in Sai Kung. The lime was used in agriculture and construction. However, it was gradually replaced by cement after the Second War World

The villagers use to send the lime by boat to nearby Hong Kong Island to sell 

The kilns are located on the eastern shore of inner Hoi Ha Wan. Limekiln industry was one of the oldest industries (1800-1939) in Hong Kong, which refined lime from either oyster shells or coral skeletons for construction and agricultural uses. In the processes, limestone, i.e. calcium carbonate, in the shells and corals would be transformed into calcium oxide by means of heating.

References

External links

 Delineation of area of existing village Hoi Ha (Sai Kung North) for election of resident representative (2019 to 2022)
 https://www.afcd.gov.hk/english/country/cou_vis/cou_vis_mar/cou_vis_mar_des/cou_vis_mar_des_hoi.html

Archaeological sites in Hong Kong
Villages in Tai Po District, Hong Kong
Places in Hong Kong
Sai Kung North